The Divān of Hafez (Persian: دیوان حافظ) is a collection of poems written by the Iranian poet Hafez. Most of these poems are in Persian, but there are some macaronic language poems (in Persian and Arabic) and a completely Arabic ghazal. The most important part of this Divān is the ghazals. Poems in other forms such as qetʿe, qasida, mathnawi and rubaʿi are as well included in the Divān. There is no evidence that Hafez's lost poems might have constituted the majority of his poetic output, and in addition, Hafez was very famous during his lifetime. Therefore he cannot have been a prolific poet. The number of ghazals that are generally accepted is less than 500: 495 ghazals in Ghazvini and Ghani edition, 486 ghazals in Natel-Khanlari's second edition and 484 ghazals in the Sayeh edition.

Overview
The Divān of Hafez was probably compiled for the first time after his death by Mohammad Golandam. However, some unconfirmed reports indicate that Hafez published his Divān in 1368 (770 AH), meaning it was edited more than twenty years before his death, but no such version exists. There are several famous manuscripts in Iran, Europe and other places that belong to the second and third quarters of the 14th century, from thirty to sixty years after the poet's death, and the most authoritative of them are less than 500 ghazals. Subsequent versions contain 600 ghazals and more. In 1958, Parviz Natel-Khanlari published a manuscript from around 813 AH that contains 152 ghazals in terms of good text. Derived manuscripts, sometimes describing Persian, Turkish, or Urdu, continued over the next four centuries. In Hafez's poem, 23 rhythms and 10 prosody metres are used.

Until 1988, translation of Divān or part of it into Urdu, Punjabi, Sindhi, Arabic, English in India and Pakistan, Divān and its excerpts, and arranging lyrics for singing in English, French, German, Russian, Armenian, Bulgarian, Czech, Chinese, Danish, Dutch, Finnish, Greek, Hungarian, Italian, Latin, Lithuanian, Norwegian, Polish, Portuguese, Romanian, Serbian, Swedish, Spanish and Turkish are obtained during these years.

According to Yarshater, no Iranian poet has been so much analyzed, interpreted and interpreted. No Persian poet can find such a combination of fertile imagination, literary expression, the right choice of silk words and expressions. He had a profound effect on the next group of lyricists. According to experts and cataloguers, during the four hundred years of compiling the Divān in the last decade of the 14th century until its publication in Calcutta in 1791 AD (1206 AH), this book has been written and copied more than any other literary work. The number of manuscripts of The Divān of Hafez is about 1700, which is scattered not only in Iran, but also in the geographical region of the Persian language and among all social classes and even rulers. In terms of the size of its Persian-speaking audiences, it has surpassed all the great works of Persian literature.

What has been published from Hafez's poems includes incomplete, complete, non-critical and critical collections, lithography, calligraphy, Facsimile and typography. At least 300 printed copies of the Divān have been cited since 1988, and more have been published since then. Hafez's influence on the lives of Iranians can be seen in the continuation of the popularity of his poems from previous generations to the present day and the use of these poems in everyday conversations. This immortality and popularity has caused a unique reflection in the culture and art of Persian speakers and has been reflected in the works of many calligraphers, painters, carpet weavers and artists.

References

Citations

Sources

 
 
 
 
 
 
 

14th-century works
14th-century Persian-language poets
Persian poems
14th-century Arabic books